Yangiariq District (Янгиариқ тумани, يەڭىەرىق تۇمەنى) is a district of Xorazm Region in Uzbekistan. The capital lies at the town Yangiariq. The district consists of 6 urban-type settlements (Yangiariq, Gulbogʻ, Soburzon, Suvgan, Tagan, Qoʻshloq) and 8 rural communities.

References

Xorazm Region
Districts of Uzbekistan